Petrovskoye is a rural locality (a selo) in Perelyoshinskoye Urban Settlement, Paninsky District, Voronezh Oblast, Russia. The population was 361 as of 2010. There are 5 streets.

Geography 
Petrovskoye is located 11 km northeast of Panino (the district's administrative centre) by road. Pereleshinsky is the nearest rural locality.

References 

Rural localities in Paninsky District